Voltage-dependent calcium channel gamma-3 subunit is a protein that in humans is encoded by the CACNG3 gene.

L-type calcium channels are composed of five subunits. The protein encoded by this gene represents one of these subunits, gamma, and is one of several gamma subunit proteins. It is an integral membrane protein that is thought to stabilize the calcium channel in an inactive (closed) state. This protein is similar to the mouse stargazin protein, mutations in which have been associated with absence seizures, also known as petit-mal or spike-wave seizures. This gene is a member of the neuronal calcium channel gamma subunit gene subfamily of the PMP-22/EMP/MP20 family. This gene is a candidate gene for a familial infantile convulsive disorder with paroxysmal choreoathetosis.

See also
 Voltage-dependent calcium channel

References

Further reading

External links 
 
 
 

Ion channels